Stepan Stepanovych Barna (born 27 April 1961, Zhyznomyr, Ukraine) is a Ukrainian political activist and later politician, member of the Verkhovna Rada. Brother of Oleh Barna.

In 1999-2006 he worked as a political activist for various organization some associated with Our Ukraine political party.

In 2006 Barna became a member of the Ternopil Oblast council.

In 2014-2015 he was a member of the Verkhovna Rada representing Petro Poroshenko Bloc.

Since 2015 he serves as a Governor of Ternopil Oblast.

References

External links
 Profile at the Official Ukraine Today portal

1979 births
Living people
People from Ternopil Oblast
Graduate of the Faculty History of Ternopil National University of Volodymyr Hnatyuk
Ternopil National Economic University alumni
Governors of Ternopil Oblast
Eighth convocation members of the Verkhovna Rada
Our Ukraine (political party) politicians
For Ukraine! politicians
Petro Poroshenko Bloc politicians